The 2022–23 Algerian Women's Elite National Championship is the 25th season of the Algerian Women's Championship, the Algerian national women's association football competition. The winners of the competition will partiticipate to the 2023 CAF Women's Champions League. Afak Relizane wins the championship for the 11th time.

Clubs

Standings

Matches

First leg

Second leg

References

External links
LNFF Official website

Algerian Women's Championship seasons
2022–23 in Algerian football
2022 in women's association football
2023 in women's association football